Argis is a commune in the Ain department in the Auvergne-Rhône-Alpes region of eastern France.

Geography
Argis is in the mountains of the southern Jura in the mountains of Bugey in the valley of the Albarine between Tenay and Saint-Rambert-en-Bugey. Altitude varies from 315 metres in the valley to 800 metres on the slopes of the valley.

The commune is some 10 km east of Amberieu-en-Bugey and 10 km south-west of Hauteville-Lompnes.  It can be accessed on the D1504 road from Saint-Rambert-en-Bugey in the north-west passing through the northern border of the commune then south to the village and continuing south to Tenay.  The D104 road also goes from the village over a tortuous mountain route to Arandas in the south-west.  There are also many small mountain roads in the commune.  The railway line from Saint-Rambert-en-Bugey to Tenay also passes through the commune parallel to the D1504 road.  There is no station in the commune with the nearest station being the one near Tenay. In addition to the village there is the small hamlet of Plomb in the south. The commune is mountainous and heavily forested.

The Albarine river passes through the commune from south to north parallel with the railway and the D1504 continuing west to join the Ain near Chez le Bret. A number of streams flow into the river including the Ruisseau de la Gorge, the Ruisseau de la Tine, the Biez Molet, the Biez Michel, and the Biez Gallet.

History
There was a lordship and a castle in the Middle Ages.

Toponymy
Over the centuries, Argis has been called:
Argil (1242)
De Argillo (1385)
Argit (1650)
Argy (1734)

Heraldry

Administration

List of mayors of Argis

Population

Sites and monuments
 Waterfalls de la Côte and de la Pissoire.

Photo gallery

Notable people
 Antoine-Gaspard Boucher d'Argis was born in the commune on 3 April 1708.

See also
Communes of the Ain department

Notes and references

External links
Argis on Géoportail, National Geographic Institute (IGN) website 
Argil on the 1750 Cassini Map

Communes of Ain